Juan José Calero Sierra (born November 5, 1998) is a Colombian footballer who plays for Sporting San José. He also holds a Mexican passport.

Club career
On 1 September 2021, he joined Gil Vicente in Portugal's top-flight Primeira Liga on loan.

Personal life
Calero is the son of former Pachuca goalkeeper Miguel Calero.

Honours
Pachuca
 Liga MX: Clausura 2016
 CONCACAF Champions League: 2016–17

References

External links

1998 births
Living people
Sportspeople from Valle del Cauca Department
Colombian footballers
Colombia youth international footballers
Association football forwards
C.F. Pachuca players
Club León footballers
Mineros de Zacatecas players
Gil Vicente F.C. players
C.D. Nacional players
Liga MX players
Ascenso MX players
Colombian expatriate footballers
Expatriate footballers in Mexico
Colombian expatriate sportspeople in Mexico
Expatriate footballers in Portugal
Colombian expatriate sportspeople in Portugal
Expatriate footballers in Costa Rica
Colombian expatriate sportspeople in Costa Rica